Reginald Crundall Punnett FRS (20 June 1875 – 3 January 1967) was a British geneticist who co-founded, with William Bateson, the Journal of Genetics in 1910.  Punnett is probably best remembered today as the creator of the Punnett square, a tool still used by biologists to predict the probability of possible genotypes of offspring.  His Mendelism (1905) is sometimes said to have been the first textbook on genetics; it was probably the first popular science book to introduce genetics to the public.

Life and work 

Reginald Punnett was born in 1875 in the town of Tonbridge in Kent, England.  While recovering from a childhood bout of appendicitis, Punnett became acquainted with Jardine's Naturalist's Library and developed an interest in natural history. Punnett was educated at Clifton College.

Attending Gonville and Caius College, Cambridge, Punnett earned a bachelor's degree in zoology in 1898 and a master's degree in 1901. Between these degrees he worked as a demonstrator and part-time lecturer at the University of St. Andrews' Natural History Department.  In October 1901, Punnett was back at Cambridge when he was elected to a Fellowship at Gonville and Caius College, working in zoology, primarily the study of worms, specifically nemerteans.  It was during this time that he and William Bateson began a research collaboration, which lasted several years.

A 
Punnett square

When Punnett was an undergraduate, Gregor Mendel's work on inheritance was largely unknown and unappreciated by scientists.  However, in 1900, Mendel's work was rediscovered by Carl Correns, Erich Tschermak von Seysenegg and Hugo de Vries.  William Bateson became a proponent of Mendelian genetics and had Mendel's work translated into English.  It was with Bateson that Reginald Punnett helped established the new science of genetics at Cambridge.  He, Bateson and Saunders co-discovered genetic linkage through experiments with chickens and sweet peas.

In 1908, unable to explain how a dominant allele would not become fixed and ubiquitous in a population, Punnett introduced one of his problems to the mathematician G. H. Hardy, with whom he played cricket. Hardy went on to formulate the Hardy–Weinberg principle, independently of the German Wilhelm Weinberg. Punnett was Superintendent of the Cambridge University Museum of Zoology from 1908 to 1909.

In 1909 he went to Sri Lanka to meet Arthur Willey, FRS, then Director of the Colombo Museum and R H Lock, then Scientific Assistant at the Peradeniya Botanical Gardens and to catch butterflies. The following year, he published a monograph, '"Mimicry" in Ceylon Butterflies, with a suggestion as to the nature of Polymorphism', in Spolia Zeylanica, the journal of the Colombo Museum, in which he voiced his opposition to gradualistic accounts of the evolution of mimicry which he later expanded on, in his 1915 book Mimicry in Butterflies.

In 1910 Punnett became a professor of biology at Cambridge, and then the first Arthur Balfour Professor of Genetics when Bateson left in 1912. In the same year, Punnett was elected a Fellow of the Royal Society. He received the society's Darwin Medal in 1922.

During World War I, Punnett successfully applied his expertise to the problem of the early determination of sex in chickens. Since only females were used for egg-production, early identification of male chicks, which were destroyed or separated for fattening, meant that limited animal-feed and other resources could be used more efficiently.  Punnett's work in this area was summarized in Heredity in Poultry (1923). With Michael Pease as his assistant, he created the first auto-sexing chicken breed, the Cambar, by transferring the barring gene of the Barred Rock to the Golden Campine.

Reginald Punnett retired in 1940, and died at the age of 91 in 1967 in Bilbrook, Somerset.

Selected writings 
 
 - A scanned copy of the second edition is here.

References

External links 

 A brief biographical sketch of Punnett
 A briefer biographical sketch of Punnett
 A brief history of the University of Cambridge's Department of Genetics
 
 

1875 births
1967 deaths
People educated at Clifton College

Alumni of Gonville and Caius College, Cambridge

English geneticists
English eugenicists
English statisticians
Fellows of the Royal Society
History of genetics
People from Tonbridge
Arthur Balfour Professors of Genetics
Fellows of Gonville and Caius College, Cambridge
Mutationism